The St. George Ravens are a Canadian Junior "A" ice hockey team based in St. George, Ontario, Canada.  They play in the Greater Metro Junior A Hockey League (GMHL).

History

Originally announced as the Cyclones, the Halton Ravens joined the GMHL in spring 2013 based in Burlington, Ontario. On September 5, 2013, the Ravens played their first game in team history, at home, against the defending league champion Bradford Rattlers which the Ravens lost 6–1.  Brett Lee scored the first goal in franchise history at 6:47 of the second period. On September 15, 2013, the Ravens won their first game, at home, versus the Powassan Eagles.  The final score was 7–4, with Adam Ostermeier scoring the game winner halfway through the third.  Mike Calouri made 29 saves for the win. In 2016–17, the Ravens moved from playing in Burlington St. George, Ontario, and became the St. George Ravens. The Ravens had a 33–7–0–2 regular season record coming and made the division finals.

Season-by-season standings

References

External links
Ravens Webpage
GMHL Webpage

2013 establishments in Ontario
Ice hockey clubs established in 2013
Ice hockey teams in Ontario